These are the full results of the 2008 NACAC Under-23 Championships in Athletics which took place between July 18 and July 20, 2008, at Estadio Universitario Alberto Chivo Cordova in Toluca, Mexico.

Men's results

100 meters

Heats
Wind: Heat 1: -0.6 m/s, Heat 2: -0.5 m/s, Heat 3: 0.0 m/s

Final
Wind: +0.3 m/s

200 meters

Heats
Wind: Heat 1: -1.2 m/s, Heat 2: -1.7 m/s, Heat 3: -1.4 m/s

Final
Wind: -0.9 m/s

400 meters

Heats

Final

800 meters

Heats

Final

1500 meters
Final

5000 meters
Final

10,000 meters
Final

3000 meters steeplechase
Final

110 meters hurdles
Final
Wind: -1.0 m/s

400 meters hurdles
Final

High jump
Final

Pole vault
Final

Long jump
Final

Triple jump
Final

Shot put
Final

Discus throw
Final

Hammer throw
Final

Javelin throw
Final

Decathlon
Final

20,000 meters walk
Final

4x100 meters relay
Final

4x400 meters relay
Final

Women's results

100 meters

Heats
Wind: Heat 1: +0.6 m/s, Heat 2: +0.9 m/s

Final
Wind: +0.3 m/s

200 meters

Heats
Wind: Heat 1: -0.7 m/s, Heat 2: +0.5 m/s

Final
Wind: -1.2 m/s

400 meters

Heats

Final

800 meters
Final

1500 meters
Final

5000 meters
Final

10,000 meters
Final

3000 meters steeplechase
Final

100 meters hurdles
Final
Wind: -0.6 m/s

400 meters hurdles
Final

High jump
Final

Pole vault
Final

Long jump
Final

Triple jump
Final

Shot put
Final

Discus throw
Final

Hammer throw
Final

Javelin throw
Final

Heptathlon
Final

10,000 meters walk
Final

4x100 meters relay
Final

4x400 meters relay
Final

References

Events at the NACAC Under-23 Championships in Athletics
NACAC U23
2008 in youth sport